Ozza Mons is an inactive volcano on planet Venus near the equator.

Four temporally variable surface hotspots were discovered at the Ganiki Chasma rift zone near volcanoes Ozza Mons and Maat Mons in 2015, suggestive of present volcanic activity. However, interpreting these types of observations from above the cloud layer correctly is a challenge.

See also
 Geology of Venus
 Volcanism on Venus

References

Volcanoes of Venus
Mountains on Venus
Potentially active volcanoes